Holger Fach (born 6 September 1962) is a German football manager and former professional player. Mainly a defensive midfielder, he could also pitch in at centre back.

Club career
Between 1981 and 1998, Fach played 416 Bundesliga games for Fortuna Düsseldorf, Borussia Mönchengladbach, Bayer Uerdingen, Bayer 04 Leverkusen and TSV 1860 Munich. He scored 67 goals during this period, and won the DFB-Pokal with Borussia in 1995. In only half-a-season with Uerdingen in 1987–88, Fach scored a career-best nine league goals, greatly contributing to the side maintaining its top flight status. He retired with Fortuna Düsseldorf in the second division in 1997–98.

International career 
During a one-year span, Fach also gained five caps for the national team, his debut coming on 31 August 1988, in a 1990 World Cup qualifier against Finland, in Helsinki (he played the entire match in a 4–0 win). He also represented West Germany at the 1988 Summer Olympics in Seoul, where he played a role in the side winning a Bronze medal scoring 2 goals in the process.

Coaching career 
After retiring as a player, Fach was appointed to coach the amateur team at Borussia Mönchengladbach (he worked with the club as a scout the previous year) and after a short intermezzo at Rot-Weiss Essen, on 21 September 2003 he became head coach for the former, leaving his post on October of the following year.

On 5 June 2005, he became the new manager for VfL Wolfsburg, but after a weak first half of the season was fired on 19 December, together with general manager Thomas Strunz.

In January 2007, Fach took the reins of second division outfit SC Paderborn 07 (being fired midway through his second season). On 18 April 2008, he took over as manager of another second-tier side, FC Augsburg. After a disappointing beginning to 2009, FC Augsburg club management passed a vote of confidence in Fach for the remainder of the season, however both sides also agreed to end their cooperation at season's end. On 13 April 2009, he was fired from FC Augsburg along with his assistant coach Dariusz Pasieka. After nine months without a job Fach was named on 25 January 2010 as the new head coach of the Kazakhstani vice-champion Lokomotiv Astana.

References

External links
 
 
 

1962 births
Living people
Sportspeople from Wuppertal
German footballers
Bundesliga players
2. Bundesliga players
Fortuna Düsseldorf players
Borussia Mönchengladbach players
Bayer 04 Leverkusen players
TSV 1860 Munich players
KFC Uerdingen 05 players
Germany international footballers
Germany under-21 international footballers
Olympic footballers of West Germany
West German footballers
Footballers at the 1988 Summer Olympics
Olympic bronze medalists for West Germany
German football managers
Borussia Mönchengladbach managers
VfL Wolfsburg managers
FC Augsburg managers
FC Astana managers
Association football defenders
Association football midfielders
German expatriate football managers
German expatriate sportspeople in Kazakhstan
Bundesliga managers
Olympic medalists in football
Rot-Weiss Essen managers
2. Bundesliga managers
SC Paderborn 07 managers
Medalists at the 1988 Summer Olympics
Footballers from North Rhine-Westphalia